The government of the City of Omaha, Nebraska consists of the Mayor of Omaha, the Omaha City Council and various departments of the City of Omaha, which is located in Douglas County, Nebraska. The city of Omaha was founded in 1854 and incorporated in 1857.

About

Omaha operates under a strong mayor form of government.Omaha Election . University of Nebraska at Lincoln. Retrieved 8/29/07. The mayor, who does not serve on the council, and seven council members are all elected to four-year terms. The mayor appoints commissioners and other officials who oversee the various departments. In addition to the mayor, Omaha's two other citywide elected officials are the clerk and the treasurer.

The Omaha City Council is the legislative branch and is made up seven members elected from districts across the city. The council enacts local ordinances and approves the city budget. Government priorities and activities are established in a budget ordinance approved annually. The council takes official action through the passage of ordinances and resolutions. 

The City of Omaha has considered consolidating with Douglas County government.

Currently
The current Mayor of Omaha is Jean Stothert, a member of the Republican Party. The City Clerk is Dan Esch, a member of the Democratic Party and members of the City Council are Pete Festerson from District 1; Juanita Johnson from 2; Danny Begley, Council President from 3; Vinny Palermo, Council Vice President from 4; Don Rowe from 5; Brinker Harding from 6 and; Aimee Melton from 7.

Departments 

 Omaha City Clerk
 Omaha City Council
 Omaha Finance Department
 Omaha Fire Department
 Omaha Greater Omaha Workforce Development
 Omaha Human Resources Department
 Omaha Human Rights and Relations Department
 Omaha Law Department
 Omaha Public Library
 Mayor's Office
 Parks and Recreation
 Omaha Planning Department
 Omaha Police Department
 Omaha Public Works Department
 Omaha Purchasing Department

Other city-related entities 
 Metropolitan Utilities District
 Omaha Housing Authority
 Omaha Public Power District
 Omaha Public Schools
 Omaha Airport Authority
 Landmarks Heritage Preservation Commission

See also
 Parks in Omaha, Nebraska
 Crime in Omaha
 Transportation in Omaha
 History of Omaha
 Education in Omaha, Nebraska

References

External links
 City of Omaha  website.